Keith Bishop may refer to:

Keith Bishop (American football) (born 1957), American football player
Keith Bishop (The Office), a character in the TV series The Office
 Keith Bishop (cricketer) (born 1949), former English cricketer